The ten-lined June beetle (Polyphylla decemlineata), also known as the watermelon beetle, is a scarab beetle found in the western United States and Canada. The adults are attracted to light and feed on foliage. They can make a hissing sound when touched or otherwise disturbed, which can resemble the hissing of a bat. This sound is made by their wings pushing down, forcing the air out between their wings and back. They can be an agricultural pest affecting a wide range of crops because their larvae feed on plant roots and can weaken or kill the plants.

Description
They are relatively large in size, some growing to sizes as large as 1.5 inches (3 cm) or more. As in other members of this genus, the males have large distinctive antennae consisting of several lamellate plates, which they close up when threatened. The antennae are used to detect pheromones emitted by the females.  The wing covers (elytra) have four long white stripes and one short stripe each. The underside of the thorax is covered with brownish hairs.

Life cycle
Eggs: The eggs are oval, dull, and creamy. They are about 1/16 of an inch long.

Larva: The grub can grow up to 2 inches with 3 pairs of legs, with a white body and brown head. The larval stage can last as long as 4 years.

References

External links

 Wayne's Word page on beetles
 The Daily Garden - Ten-lined June Beetle

Beetles of North America
Polyphylla
Beetles described in 1823